The Rowdyman is a 1972 comedy film with moralistic overtones, set in Newfoundland. It was written by and starred native Newfoundlander Gordon Pinsent.

The film is about Will Cole (Pinsent). In his thirties, he doesn't take life seriously, but his antics bring pain and tragic consequences to friends and family. He is sexually liberated and has sex with a stranger (Dawn Greenhalgh) on a train and his carelessness at work causes pain for his best friend and co-worker (Frank Converse).

Production
The film had a budget of $350,000.

Reception
Pinsent won the Canadian Film Award for Best Actor at the 24th Canadian Film Awards in 1972. The film was also nominated for Best Picture. Pinsent also won the Earle Grey Award for Best Actor at the 2nd ACTRA Awards.

It was featured in the Canadian Cinema television series which aired on CBC Television in 1974. It was later screened at the 1984 Festival of Festivals as part of Front & Centre, a special retrospective program of artistically and culturally significant films from throughout the history of Canadian cinema.

References

Works cited

External links

The Film Reference Library

1972 films
English-language Canadian films
Films set in Newfoundland and Labrador
Canadian comedy films
Films directed by Peter Carter
1970s English-language films
1970s Canadian films